The Latin title rex has the meaning of "king, ruler" (monarch). It is derived from Proto-Indo-European *h₃rḗǵs. Its cognates include Sanskrit rājan, Gothic reiks, and Old Irish rí, etc. Its Greek equivalent is archon (ἄρχων), "leader, ruler, chieftain".

The chief magistrate of the Roman Kingdom was titled Rex Romae (King of Rome).

Usage
Rex Catholicissimus (Most Catholic King), awarded by the Pope to the Spanish monarchs since 1493
Romanorum Rex (King of the Romans), used by the German king since the 11th century
Rex Britanniae (King of Britain), Æthelbald of Mercia (737)
Rex Scottorum (King of the Scots), used by the Scottish king between the 11th century and 1707
Rex Sclavorum (King of the Slavs), various Medieval Slavic rulers

See also
R.
Reich
Dux
Basileus
Germanic king

References 

Latin words and phrases
Roman historiography
Royal titles
Kings